Camille Laus (born 23 May 1993) is a Belgian athlete sprinter. She ran in the national team which placed 5th in the 4×400 m relay at the 2019 World Championships, setting Belgian record of 3:26.58 sec in the heats.

Laus also competed in the 4×400 m mixed relay event at the 2019 World Championships, where Belgian team placed 6th with the national record time of 3:14.22 s.

Her personal best in the 400 metres is 51.49 sec set in 2018.

References

External links

 

1993 births
Living people
Belgian female sprinters
Place of birth missing (living people)
World Athletics Championships athletes for Belgium
Belgian Athletics Championships winners
Athletes (track and field) at the 2020 Summer Olympics
Olympic athletes of Belgium
21st-century Belgian women